Laughing at Danger is a 1940 American crime film directed by Howard Bretherton and written by George Waggner and John W. Krafft. The film stars Frankie Darro, Joy Hodges, George F. Houston, Mantan Moreland, Kay Sutton and Guy Usher. The film was released on August 12, 1940, by Monogram Pictures.

Plot

Cast          
Frankie Darro as Frankie Kelly
Joy Hodges as Mary Baker
George F. Houston as Dan Haggerty
Mantan Moreland as Jefferson
Kay Sutton as Mrs. Inez Morton
Guy Usher as Alvin Craig
Lillian Elliott as Mrs. Kelly
Veda Ann Borg as Celeste
Betty Compson as Mrs. Van Horn
Rolfe Sedan as Pierre
Maxine Leslie as Florence
Ralph Peters as Dugan
Gene O'Donnell as Chuck Benson

References

External links
 

1940 films
American crime films
1940 crime films
Monogram Pictures films
Films directed by Howard Bretherton
American black-and-white films
1940s English-language films
1940s American films